Jimmy Connors defeated Ken Rosewall in the final, 6–1, 6–1, 6–4 to win the gentlemen's singles tennis title at the 1974 Wimbledon Championships.

Jan Kodeš was the defending champion, but lost in the quarterfinals to Connors.

Uniquely, due to the WCT ban in place at the 1972 championships and the ATP boycott of 1973, three unofficial "defending champions" competed in the event. John Newcombe, Stan Smith and Kodeš were all unbeaten from their last singles matches at the championships when this year's event commenced.

Seeds

  John Newcombe (quarterfinals)
  Ilie Năstase (fourth round)
  Jimmy Connors (champion)
  Stan Smith (semifinals)
  Björn Borg (third round)
  Jan Kodeš (quarterfinals)
  Tom Okker (fourth round)
  Arthur Ashe (third round)
  Ken Rosewall (final)
  Alex Metreveli (quarterfinals)
  Tom Gorman (fourth round)
  Manuel Orantes (fourth round)

Qualifying

Draw

Finals

Top half

Section 1

Section 2

Section 3

Section 4

Bottom half

Section 5

Section 6

Section 7

Section 8

References

External links

 1974 Wimbledon Championships – Men's draws and results at the International Tennis Federation

Men's Singles
Wimbledon Championship by year – Men's singles